Saltaire is a village on Fire Island in the southern part of the Town of Islip in Suffolk County, New York, United States. The year-round population was 37 at the 2010 census, which, as a summer beach community, increases many times over in the summer.

History 
 
Saltaire was founded in 1910 and incorporated in 1917.

The village was heavily damaged and six residents killed in the Hurricane of 1938.

In early 2009 the village underwent a beach restoration project.

The village sustained damage by Hurricane Sandy in 2012.

Transportation
An individual has three ways to get to the community (and the island in general). One could ride the Fire Island Ferries, arrive by private boat or travel by car (restricted). Use of the ferries is by far the most popular means of getting to Saltaire. It is also possible to reach Saltaire by foot or bicycle from other Fire Island communities, by one of the inland walks or on the beach.

Geography

The village is located on the western part of Fire Island between the Great South Bay and the Atlantic Ocean and between the hamlets of Kismet (to the west) and Fair Harbor (to the east).

Among other things, Saltaire is known for its great softball league in the summer.

There are 459 housing units in the community, as well as a Village Hall and Court, general market, Fire House, two churches, and a members yacht club.

Saltaire is the second largest Fire Island community, and it is situated on the widest area on the Fire Island (approximately one-half mile). Fire Island Ferry service to Saltaire leaves from the Bay Shore Fire Island ferry terminal.

Saltaire consists of boardwalks and sand paths. Not many full-sized cars are found on the roads. Bicycles are the main form of transportation.

Demographics

The following demographics represent year-round Saltaire households (not representative of total ownership, or summer population):

As of the census of 2000, there were 43 people, 14 households, and 9 families residing in the village. The population density was 155.0 people per square mile (59.3/km2). There were 401 housing units at an average density of 1,445.2 per square mile (553.0/km2). The racial makeup of the village was 79.07% White, 9.30% Asian, and 11.63% from two or more races. Hispanic or Latino of any race were 2.33% of the population.

There were 14 households, out of which 35.7% had children under the age of 18 living with them, 57.1% were married couples living together, and 28.6% were non-families. 14.3% of all households were made up of individuals, and 14.3% had someone living alone who was 65 years of age or older. The average household size was 3.07 and the average family size was 3.50.

In the village, the population was spread out, with 37.2% under the age of 18, 25.6% from 25 to 44, 16.3% from 45 to 64, and 20.9% who were 65 years of age or older. The median age was 36 years. For every 100 females, there were 152.9 males. For every 100 females age 18 and over, there were 107.7 males.

The median income for a household in the village was $75,252, and the median income for a family was $49,500. Males had a median income of $51,250 versus $41,250 for females. The per capita income for the village was $17,125. None of the population and none of the families were below the poverty line.

Government 

The Village is governed by a Mayor and Board of Trustees.

Fire company 

The Saltaire Volunteer Fire Company, Inc., was established in 1969 to provide fire suppression services to the village. In 1986, the fire company became the first Fire Island fire department to provide Emergency Medical Services to the village and surrounding communities. The department currently has two (pumper) engines, one utility rescue truck, two fire/EMS first response Mules, one ambulance, one EMS transport vehicle and a Chief's/personnel vehicle. These vehicles are often modified for use in the unique Fire Island geography with four-wheel drive, lifted suspensions, and large-diameter tires.

Education 
Children of year-round residents are zoned to Fire Island School District. They attend the sole school of the district, Woodhull School in Ocean Beach until grade 6, at which point they are bussed to Long Island for grades 7-12, with a choice of either the Bay Shore School District (which operates Bay Shore Middle School and Bay Shore High School) or to the Islip School District (which operates Islip High School). They may also be bussed to one of the many private and parochial schools on the mainland.

Saltaire Yacht Club 

The Saltaire Yacht Club, founded in 1911, underwent rebuilding in winter 2015 due to damage from Hurricane Sandy. All property owners and renters in the village are eligible to join. The club has five Har-Tru tennis courts which can be used by tennis members and their house guests. In addition, it has a bar and the only restaurant in the village which serves dinner six nights a week for its members. Each summer it offers a wide variety of activities and in the past has featured Broadway comedians, singers and entertainers. The club owns a fleet of boats and offers sailing lessons to children during the week. Adult members may take private sailing lessons on the weekend, and competent sailors are permitted to use the club boats. Approximately 250 of the 400 households in the village are members of the club. The club and the village are separate organizations but work closely together. The club allows the village to host its annual Labor Day show put on by the children in the village, show children's movies once a week, and use the club for other activities during the summer.

References

External links

 Fire Island official website
 Village of Saltaire official website
 Saltaire Volunteer Fire Company Website

Fire Island, New York
Islip (town), New York
Villages in New York (state)
Villages in Suffolk County, New York
Populated coastal places in New York (state)